Biathlon at the 2006 Winter Olympics consisted of ten biathlon events. They were held at the Cesana-San Sicario arena.  The events began on 11 February and ended on 25 February 2006.  Approximately 6,500 spectators were expected by the organizing committee. In these games, biathlon events were open to both men and women but they raced in different distances in their own events.

Men from 28 nations and women from 27 nations qualified to participate in the events. Only seven nations in total took home medals, Germany winning the most (5 gold, 4 silver, 2 bronze). Six biathletes won 3 medals each: Albina Akhatova, Kati Wilhelm, Martina Glagow, Michael Greis, Ole Einar Bjørndalen, and Sven Fischer. Greis won the most gold medals, with a total of three.

Qualification
The top 20 countries at the International Biathlon Union Nations Cup ranking of 2004–05 are permitted to pick four biathletes for each event, and five biathletes for the whole Olympics. The top five may send a sixth biathlete as a reserve. The countries seeded 21st to 28th (27th for women) may send a maximum of one biathlete. Other countries may not send biathletes unless the top 28 countries do not fill their quota. These restrictions apply to each gender, so that the countries who appear in the top 20 in both the men's and the women's list are able to send five men and five women. All entries were to have been submitted to the organizing committee by 30 January 2006.

The following table lists the 28 nations that qualified for the men's events and the 27 nations that qualified for the women's events:

Medal summary

Medal table
Of the thirty-seven competing nations, seven of them took home all the medals. With over double the medals of any other nation, Germany ranked number one.

Men's events

Women's events

Olga Pyleva of Russia originally placed second in the women's individual race, but was found to be in violation of anti-doping rules when she tested positive for carphedon, and she was then disqualified.

Participating nations
Thirty-seven nations qualified biathletes to compete in the events. Below is a list of the competing nations; in parentheses are the number of national competitors.

See also
Biathlon at the 2006 Winter Paralympics

References

 
2006 Winter Olympics events
2006
Winter Olympics
Biathlon competitions in Italy